Periplocoideae is a subfamily of the dogbane plant family, Apocynaceae. It was not divided into tribes as of 2014.

Genera
In 2014, the subfamily was circumscribed to contain the following genera:

Atherandra Decne.
Baroniella Costantin & Gallaud
Baseonema Schltr. & Rendle
Batesanthus N.E.Br.
Buckollia Venter & R.L.Verh.
Camptocarpus Decne.
Cryptolepis R.Br.
Cryptostegia R.Br.
Decalepis Wight & Arn.
Ectadium E.Mey.
Epistemma D.V.Field & J.B.Hall
Finlaysonia Wall.
Gymnanthera R.Br.
Hemidesmus R.Br.
Ischnolepis Jum. & H.Perrier
Kappia Venter, A.P.Dold & R.L.Verh.
Maclaudia Venter & R.L.Verh.
Mondia Skeels
Myriopteron Griff.
Parquetina Baill.
Pentopetia Decne.
Periploca L.
Petopentia Bullock
Phyllanthera Blume
Raphionacme Harv.
Sacleuxia Baill. (sometimes included in Cryptolepis)
Sarcorrhiza Bullock
Schlechterella K.Schum.
Stomatostemma N.E. Br. (sometimes included in Cryptolepis)
Streptocaulon Wight & Arn.
Tacazzea Decne.
Telectadium Baill.
Zygostelma Benth.

References

External links

 
Gentianales subfamilies